The Boy Bands Have Won is the shortened title of the thirteenth studio album by British music group Chumbawamba, released in 2008. Its full title contains 156 words (865 characters), and holds the Guinness World Record for the longest album title, beating Soulwax's Most of the Remixes 552-character-long title .

Background
The album continues the band's move into politically and socially aware folk music. Themes addressed on this album include suicide bombers, Philip Larkin, social networking websites, surviving a firing squad, evolution, and the pains of the workplace.

The album was recorded by the five-piece line-up of Jude Abbott, Lou Watts, Boff Whalley, Neil Ferguson, and Phil "Ron" Moody and features guest appearances by several other artists.

Track listing
All tracks written, arranged, and produced by Chumbawamba except where noted.

Samples from previous albums

Personnel
 Lou Watts – vocals
 Boff Whalley – vocals, ukulele
 Neil Ferguson – vocals, guitars
 Jude Abbott – vocals, trumpet
 Phil "Ron" Moody – vocals, accordion

Additional musicians
 Oysterband, Roy Bailey, Robb Johnson, Ray Hearne, Barry Coope & Jim Boyes – vocals
 Charlie Cake Marching Band – brass
 David P. Crickmore – banjo on 7, 22; square-necked dobro on 18, 22
 Jo Freya – sax on 2
 Harry Hamer – cajon on 9, 11; tablas on 16
 The Pudsey Players – strings on 6, 11, 18

Notes

References

External links

The Boy Bands Have Won at YouTube (streamed copy where licensed)

Chumbawamba albums
2008 albums
No Masters albums
Westpark Music albums
Guinness World Records